The Bethany Presbyterian Church Complex in Giles County, Tennessee was listed on the National Register of Historic Places in 1989.

The complex includes the Bethany Presbyterian Church (1853), the Bethany Academy (1858), and the Bethany Church Manse (1887).  The church "is an excellent local example of antebellum Greek Revival chapel architecture.  The academy is the oldest educational building in Giles County.

The site was removed from the National Register in 2020.

References

Presbyterian churches in Tennessee
Churches on the National Register of Historic Places in Tennessee
Churches completed in 1853
19th-century Presbyterian church buildings in the United States
Churches in Giles County, Tennessee
National Register of Historic Places in Giles County, Tennessee
Former National Register of Historic Places in Tennessee